Kam Zard or Kam-e Zard may refer to:
Kam Zard, Bushehr